Braian Emanuel Brandán (born 3 November 1998) is an Argentine professional footballer who plays as a defender for Acassuso.

Career
Brandán began his career with Chacarita Juniors, which preceded a move to Acassuso. After making his professional bow on 21 August 2018 against Colegiales in Primera B Metropolitana, the defender started the opening eight games of their 2018–19 campaign.

Career statistics
.

References

External links

1998 births
Living people
Place of birth missing (living people)
Argentine footballers
Association football defenders
Primera B Metropolitana players
Club Atlético Acassuso footballers